Ayatollah Sayyid Ali al-Musawi al-Sabziwari (b. 1948) is an Iraqi Shia scholar, and the son of Grand Ayatollah Abd al-A'la al-Sabziwari.

al-Sabziwari is a teacher at the al-Sabziwari Mosque in Najaf, and a representative of his late father's marja'iya.

Early life and education 
al-Sabziwari was born to Sayyid Abd al-A'la al-Sabziwari, and the daughter of Sayyid Muhammad-Jawad al-Modarresi. He is the second of three sons, and comes from a respectable religious family. His family claim descent from the seventh Shia Imam, Musa ibn Jafar.

Education 
He began his religious education at a young age. He completed his studies and reached the level of ijtihad in the seventies. His sotooh 'ulya (intermediary-advanced studies) classes were considered of the most importance in Najaf, in the nineties.

Works 
al-Sabziwari has books in jurisprudence and principles of jurisprudence. Some of them include:

 Kayfa Naqra' al-Quran (How we read the Quran)
 Mabahith Fi al-Manthuma al-Riwa'iya al-Shi'iya (Research in the system of Shia narrations)

See also 
 Abd al-A'la al-Sabziwari
 Abu al-Qasim al-Khoei
 Mohammad Taqi al-Modarresi

References

External links 
 Library of al-Sabziwari's books by al-Feker E-book Network (in Arabic)

Living people
1952 births
Iraqi religious leaders
People from Mashhad
Shia scholars of Islam